Those Merry Souls (Chinese: 時來運轉) is a 1985 Hong Kong action comedy horror film directed by Lau Kar-wing and starring Yuen Biao and Eric Tsang.

Cast
 Yuen Biao as Chiu Chi-lung
 Eric Tsang as Ng Kuai-tak
 Lam Ching-ying as Tak's father
 Stanley Fung as Uncle Chiu
 Elaine Jin as Waterloo Tai
 Ng Ha-ping as Lily Ting
 Lily Li as Auntie Pearl
 Richard Ng as Fernando Ng
 Lau Kar-wing as Person practicing Kung Fu
 Chung Fat as Death Messenger
 Yam Ho as Janitor
 Wu Ma as Ma
 Billy Lau as Doctor
 Moon Lee as Fung
 Lam Wai as Movie Patron
 Fung King-man as Alley Gang Member
 Billy Ching as Billy
 Lam Leung-wai as Lok Man
 Yue Ming as George
 Sammo Hung as Movie Director
 Fruit Chan as Assistant Director
 Pan Yun-sheng as Man at Beach
 Chin Ka-lok as Beach Thug
 Chu Tau as Beach Thug
 Mak Wai-cheung as Beach Thug
 Lee Chi-kit
 Pang Yun-cheung as Thug in Public
 Chun Kwai-bo as Thug in Public

References 

1985 films
1980s action comedy films
1980s martial arts comedy films
1980s comedy horror films
Hong Kong action comedy films
Hong Kong supernatural horror films
Hong Kong black comedy films
Hong Kong martial arts comedy films
Martial arts horror films
Hong Kong slapstick comedy films
Hong Kong ghost films
Golden Harvest films
1980s Cantonese-language films
Films set in Hong Kong
Films shot in Hong Kong
1985 comedy films
1980s Hong Kong films